In nuclear physics and chemistry, the  value for a reaction is the amount of energy absorbed or released during the nuclear reaction. The value relates to the enthalpy of a chemical reaction or the energy of radioactive decay products. It can be determined from the masses of reactants and products.   values affect reaction rates. In general, the larger the positive    value for the reaction, the faster the reaction proceeds, and the more likely the reaction is to "favor" the products.

where the masses are in atomic mass units.

Definition 
The conservation of energy, between the initial and final energy of a nuclear process  enables the general definition of    based on the mass–energy equivalence. For any radioactive particle decay, the kinetic energy difference will be given by:

where    denotes the kinetic energy of the mass   .
A reaction with a positive    value is exothermic, i.e. has a net release of energy, since the kinetic energy of the final state is greater than the kinetic energy of the initial state.
A reaction with a negative    value is endothermic, i.e. requires a net energy input, since the kinetic energy of the final state is less than the kinetic energy of the initial state. Observe that a chemical reaction is exothermic when it has a negative enthalpy of reaction, in contrast a positive  value in a nuclear reaction.

The  value can also be expressed in terms of the Mass excess  of the nuclear species as:

Proof The mass of a nucleus can be written as  where  is the mass number (sum of number of protons and neutrons) and MeV/c. Note that the count of nucleons is conserved in a nuclear reaction.

Applications 
Chemical    values are measurement in calorimetry. Exothermic chemical reactions tend to be more spontaneous and can emit light or heat, resulting in runaway feedback(i.e. explosions).

  values are also featured in particle physics. For example, Sargent's rule states that weak reaction rates are proportional to 5. The    value is the kinetic energy released in the decay at rest. For neutron decay, some mass disappears as neutrons convert to a proton, electron and antineutrino:

The neutron has no initial kinetic energy since it is at rest. In beta decay, a typical   is around 1 MeV.

The decay energy is divided among the products in a continuous distribution for more than two products. Measuring this spectrum allows one to find the mass of a product. Experiments are studying emission spectrums to search for neutrinoless decay and neutrino mass; this is the principle of the ongoing KATRIN experiment.

See also
Binding energy
Calorimeter (particle physics)
Decay energy
Fusion energy gain factor
Pandemonium effect

Notes and references

External links 
  – interactive query form for -value of requested decay.
  – demonstrates simply the mass-energy equivalence.

Nuclear physics